Stade de Yamoussoukro is a stadium in Yamoussoukro, Ivory Coast. The stadium has a capacity of 20,000 seats.

On 1 March 2018, an agreement between the government of Ivory Coast and an association formed of Alcor, Sogea-Satom, Egis and Baudin Chateauneuf was signed.

On 19 October 2018, the stadium was broke ground by Ivorian Prime Minister Amadou Gon Coulibaly.

On 11 June 2021, the Stadium was handed over to the Yamoussoukro Municipality and will host Ligue 1 games.

The stadium is expected to host many matches of the 2023 Africa Cup of Nations.

Construction 
Despite Covid19 situation, efforts were made to continue the construction of the stadium.

The construction was completed in summer 2021.

Inauguration
The inauguration was supposed to be held in September 2021. However the Confederation of African Football found some shortcomings about the stadium, mainly in terms of security, and the matches involving the Ivory Coast national football team had to be moved elsewhere.
The stadium was inaugurated on 3 June 2022, during the 2023 Africa Cup of Nations qualification and the match between Ivory Coast and Zambia. Ivory Coast won 3–1.

References

Athletics (track and field) venues in Ivory Coast
Football venues in Ivory Coast
Sport in Yamoussoukro
Multi-purpose stadiums
Buildings and structures in Yamoussoukro
2023 Africa Cup of Nations stadiums